WWC Euphoria is an annual professional wrestling event promoted by  World Wrestling Council in Puerto Rico since 2007. This event is always celebrated as the first show of the year.

2007

This event was held on Saturday, January 6, 2007 on Juan Ramon Loubriel Stadium at Bayamón, Puerto Rico.

WWC Universal Champion: Eddie Colón vs Heidenreich
Carlos Colón vs. Victor Jovica
Vampiro vs. Huracán Castillo
Luchador Misterioso vs Bronco
José Rivera Jr. & Noriega vs Terror Inc.
Fireblaze vs Alex Montalvo
Tim Arson vs Rico Suave
Superstar Romeo vs. Barrabás Jr.
WWC Junior Lightheavyweight Champion: Hammett vs. Rick Stanley
Rikochet vs. La Pulga

The second card of the event was celebrated next day, January 7, 2007 at Fajardo, Puerto Rico

Eddie Colón vs. Bronco
Vampiro vs. Heidenreich
Noriega vs. Black Pain
Fireblaze & Jose Rivera Jr. & Tim Arson vs. Alex Montalvo, Barrabás Jr. & Rico Suave
Chicky Starr vs. Huracán Castillo
Hammett vs. Elí Rodríguez
Génesis vs. La Bella Carmen
Rikochet vs. La Pulga

2008

This event was celebrated at the Coliseo de Puerto Rico José Miguel Agrelot at San Juan, Puerto Rico.

Carlito vs Chris Masters
Orlando Colón & Eddie Colón w/ Stacy vs Konnan & Ron Killings – Guitar Revenge
Último Dragón vs Joey Mercury
Joe Bravo vs Barrabas Jr.
WWC Tag Team Champions:TLC Match: Chris Joel & Noriega vs Thunder & Lightning
Carlos Colón vs Víctor Jovica
Rico Suave vs Huracan Castillo
Mini Abismo Negro vs Octagoncito

2009

This event was celebrated on January 3, 2009 in Coliseo Rubén Rodriguez at Bayamón, Puerto Rico.

WWC Universal Champion: Ray González vs El Bronco
WWC Tag Team Champions: Thunder & Lightning vs Elijah Burke & Armando Alejandro Estrada
WWC Puerto Rico Heavyweight Champion: BJ vs Steve Corino
Shane "The Glamour Boy" vs Charles "The Hammer" Evans
Eugene vs Snitsky
WWC Tag Team #1 Contenders: Huracán Castillo & Rico Suave vs Texas Outlaws
Ángel vs Tommy Diablo
El Profe vs Little Ricky Rubio
The Sons of Tonga vs Los Aéreos (Hiram Tua y El Sensacional Carlitos)

2010

This event was celebrated on January 16, 2010 in Coliseo de Puerto Rico, Jose M. Agrelot.

Copa Luchador de la Década: Ray González beat Carlito and Ricky Banderas
Eddie Colón (Primo) vs Orlando Colón
WWC Tag Team Champion: La Amenaza Illegal (Bryan & Chicano) vs Thunder & Lightning
WWC Universal Heavyweight Champion: BJ defeated Noriega
El Bronco vs Black Pain w/ Chicky Starr (as Manarger)
Shawn Spears vs Idol Stevens
King Tonga Jr. beat Abbad
El Sensacional Carlitos pinned Hiram Tua

2011

This event was celebrated in three dates; January 7, 8, and 9:

The first card was celebrated on January 7, 2011 at Dolores 'Toyita' Martinez Coliseum Juana Diaz.

 Lynx beat Angel
 CJ O'Doyle defeat Hideo Saito
 Killer Kat pinned Black Rose
 BJ  & Joe Bravo defeat (DQ) Thunder & Lightning 
 Mr Big defeat Noriega
 Rikochet & Mascarita Dorada beat El Niche & Pierrothcito
 Orlando Colon vs El Sensacional Carlitos

The second card was celebrated on January 8, 2011 at Jose 'Pepin' Cestero Court in Bayamón.

 Ricky Banderas  vs  Carlito w/ Hercules Ayala as Referee
 MVP vs Orlando Colon
 El Sensacional Carlitos vs Hideo Saito
 Joe Bravo vs Mr. X
 BJ vs Noriega 
 Thunder & Lightning vs Los Rabiosos (Mr. Big y Blitz)
 Mascarita Dorada vs Pierrothcito
 Chris Joel vs CJ O'Doyle
 Lynx vs El Niche w/Black Rose

The last card was celebrated on January 9, 2011 at Rebekah Colberg in Cabo Rojo.

El Niche beat Rikochet 
CJ O'Doyle pinned Mr X 
Joe Bravo defeat Hideo Saito
Los Rabiosos vs Thunder & Lightning (DDQ)
Pierrothcito beat Mascarita Dorada
Carlitos defeat Noriega 
MVP & Ricky Banderas defeat Carlito y Orlando Colon

2012

The first card was celebrated on January 6, 2012 at Coliseo Salvador Dijols in Ponce.

 AJ Castillo vs Bolo The Red Bulldog
 El Invader vs Chicky Starr
 Huracan Castillo vs Diabolico
 Carlito vs The Precious One Gilbert
 Kenny Dykstra vs El Sensacional Carlitos
 Los Fugitivos de la Calle & Johnny Ringo vs Mr. Big & The Maximo Brothers
 Blue Demon, Jr. vs Chavo Guerrero Jr.

The second card was celebrated on January 7, 2012 at Coliseo Ruben Rodriguez in Bayamón.

 Johnny Ringo vs Diabolico
 Blue Demon Jr. vs Kenny Dykstra
 Los Fugitivos de la Calle vs Maximo Brothers
 Huracan Castillo vs Chicky Starr
 Ray Gonzalez vs The Precious One Gilbert
 El Sensacional Carlitos vs Chavo Guerrero Jr.
 Carlito vs  Ricky Banderas

The last card was celebrated on January 8, 2012 at Coliseo Luis T. Diaz in Aguadilla

 Bolo The Red Bulldog vs AJ Castillo
 Mr. Big vs Johnny Ringo
 El Sensacional Carlitos vs Diabolico
 Los Fugitivos de la Calle & Huracan Castillo vs Maximo Brothers & Chicky Starr
 Blue Demon Jr vs The Precious One Gilbert

2013

This event was celebrated on January 6, 2013 at Ruben Rodriguez Coliseum in Bayamon, PR
 Huracán Castillo defeat Barrabás Jr.
 Sebastián Guerra defeat El Diabólico 
 Xix Xavant & AJ Castillo defeat El Coronel y Mr. X
 The Academy Chris Angel defeat Samson Walker
 Gilbert defeat Andy Leavine
 Thunder & Lightning defeat Sons of Samoa
 El Invader defeat Carlito (via DQ)
 Rey Fenix pinned Savio Vega 
 Ricky Banderas defeat Apolo

2014

This event was celebrated on January 6, 2014 at Ruben Rodriguez Coliseum in Bayamon, PR
 Syler Andrews defeat Erik Scorpion
 Mike Mendoza defeat El Diabólico 
 Ash defeat AJ Castillo
 Mighty Ursus defeat TNT (via DQ)
 Chicano & Xix Xavant defeat Sons of Samoa
 Los Matadores defeat Thunder & Lightning
 Carlito & El Invader defeat Ray Gonzalez& Ricky Santana 
 Apolo defeat Gilbert (via DQ)

2015

This event was celebrated on January 3, 2015 at Ruben Rodriguez Coliseum in Bayamon, PR
 Xix Xavant and Chicky Starr defeated los Templarios
 Mike Mendoza defeated El Diabolico in a First Blood Match
 Samiel Adams defeated Tommy Diablo after the intervention of the revolution
 Black Rose defeated La Tigresa with Stacy Colón as special referee
 Chicano retained the Puerto Rico Heavyweight Championship against El Bronco
 Miguel Pérez and Hurricane Castillo retained the WWC Tag Team titles against The Sons of Samoa
 Ray Gonzalez defeated Jinder Mahal in an Indian Strap Match
 Carlito retained the Universal Championship against The Mighty Ursus in a match with the ring surrounded by fire

A retirement ceremony was held for Invader I on that night. Wrestlers surrounded the ring. Chicky Starr, Carlos Colon, Ray Gonzalez and Carlito among those who talked about the Invader wrestling career. He endorsed Mike Mendoza as a future star and gave thanks to the fans.

2016

El Hijo de Ray González defeated Scotty Santiago
Black Pain defeated Mighty Ursus
Ray Gonzalez beat El Hijo de Dos Caras in street fight match
Mr. 450 Hammett retained the Universal Championship against Carlito in a TLC match

2017

This event was celebrated on January 7, 2017 at Ruben Rodriguez Coliseum in Bayamon, PR
 Tommy Diablo (c) beat Angel Cotto WWC Junior Heavyweight Title Match
 Apolo (w/Habana) beat The Mighty Ursus Singles Match
 Mike Mendoza beat Chicano (c), Angel, Angel Fashion, El Cuervo, El Diabolico, Peter The Bad Romance and Ray Gonzalez Jr WWC Puerto Rican Title Eight Man Battle Royal
 Thunder & Lightning (c) beat La Revolucion (La Revolucion I & La Revolucion II) WWC Tag Team Title Match
 El Cuervo beat El Hijo de Dos Caras Singles Match
 Ray Gonzalez beat MVP Singles Match
 Alberto El Patron vs. Carlito – No Contest WWC Universal Title Match (vacant)

2018
After Hurricane Maria hit Puerto Rico, WWC shutdown for a couple of months. For this reason the 2018 event wasn't celebrated.

2019
The event was held in Guaynabo, Puerto Rico
 Xavant vs Eddie Colón
 Gilbert vs Orlando Colón
 Mighty Ursus vs Carlito
 Pedro Portillo vs Chicano

2020

This event was celebrated on January 4, 2020 at Ruben Rodriguez Coliseum in Bayamon, PR
 Orlando Colón(C) retains the Universal Championship over Texano Jr.
 Ricky Banderas defeats Eddie Colón.
 Gilbert defeats Carlito.
 Mighty Ursus(C) retains the WWC Puerto Rico Championship over Bellito.
 Khaos & Abaddon(C) retain the Tag Team Championship over La Revolución.
 Royal Rumble. The winner gets to challenge any champion during 2020. Winner Xix Xavant.
 La Potencia defeats Doom Patrol.
 Ray González hosted a live edition of El Café del Milenio with Special Guest Peter John Ramos.

2023

This event was celebrated on January 8, 2023 at Ruben Rodriguez Coliseum in Bayamon, PR
 Mighty Ursus defeats Super Gladiador, WWC Puerto Rico Heavyweight Title #1 Contendership Match
 Vanilla Vargas defeats Yaide
 La Revolucion  defeat La Seguridad Hardcore Tag Team Match
 Mike Nice defeats Nihan (c) - TITLE CHANGE WWC Puerto Rico Heavyweight Title Match
 Eddie Colon defeats Gilbert
 Intelecto 5 Estrellas (c) defeats Fandango, WWC Universal Heavyweight Title Match
 Carlito defeats John Morrison
 Ray Gonzalez defeats Xavant, Hair Vs. WWC Management Match

See also

Professional wrestling in Puerto Rico
List of professional wrestling promotions

References

Professional wrestling shows
Professional wrestling in Puerto Rico
2007 in professional wrestling
World Wrestling Council